Soyuz 37 (Union 37) was a 1980 Soviet crewed space flight to the Salyut 6 space station. It was the 13th mission to and 11th successful docking at the orbiting facility. The Soyuz 37 crew were the third to visit the long-duration Soyuz 35 resident crew.

Soyuz 37 carried Soviet Viktor Gorbatko and Pham Tuân, the first Asian and first Vietnamese cosmonaut, into space. They swapped Soyuz craft with the long-duration crew and returned to Earth in Soyuz 36, the resident crew later used their craft to return to Earth.

Crew

Backup crew

Mission parameters
Mass: 
Perigee: 
Apogee: 
Inclination: 51.61°
Period: 89.12 minutes

Mission highlights

Pham Tuan of Vietnam arrived with Commander Viktor Gorbatko aboard Salyut 6 in Soyuz 37; they both returned to Earth in the Soyuz 36 spacecraft approximately eight days later. Tuan's 30 experiments involved observing Vietnam from space, life sciences (including tests of growth of Vietnamese azolla water ferns, with application to future closed-loop life support systems), and materials processing.  The long-duration crew launched in Soyuz 35 returned to Earth in the Soyuz 37 spacecraft at the end of their 186-day mission.

References

External links 
 Soyuz 37 Part of Salyut Family
 РКК "ЭНЕРГИЯ" – ХРОНОЛОГИЯ ПИЛОТИРУЕМЫХ ПОЛЕТОВ

Crewed Soyuz missions
1980 in the Soviet Union
1980 in Vietnam
Soviet Union–Vietnam relations
Spacecraft launched in 1980
Spacecraft which reentered in 1980
Spacecraft launched by Soyuz-U rockets